Tony Bullen (2 August 1931 – 9 December 2014) was a British speed skater. He competed in three events at the 1964 Winter Olympics.

References

1931 births
2014 deaths
British male speed skaters
Olympic speed skaters of Great Britain
Speed skaters at the 1964 Winter Olympics
Sportspeople from Nottingham